Face of Nepal is Asia's largest model hunt platform where Nepalese models participate to be offered the chance to represent Nepal at the Asia New Star Model Contest.

Competition 
Face of Nepal was started in 2016 by Badal Saboo, with the prize for the 4 top winners going to Suwon City, Korea to compete in the Asia New Model Contest, a contest partnered with the Korea Model Association (KMA). The KMA has organized the Asia Model Festival, Asia's largest, for the past 10 years.

The Face of Nepal 2016 pageant took place on April 29, 2016, at Kathmandu. The winners were Ritesh Raj Gurung and Al Hang Rae, who won the prize. First runner up went to Parmita RL Rana and Sameer Kunwar Rana who withdrew due to personal reasons, resulting in Bhaskar Baniya being given the 1st runner up title. The Asia New Model Contest took place on 19 May 2016, with 25 countries taking place.

Titleholders
Color key
  Declared as Winner
  Ended as Runner-up
  Ended as one of the top Semi-Finalists

References

Links
Official Website 

Fashion events
Fashion events in Nepal
2016 establishments in Nepal